The 2002 European Taekwondo Championships were held in Samsun, Turkey. The event took place from 26 to 29 May, 2002.

Medal summary

Men

Women

References

External links 
 European Taekwondo Union

European Taekwondo Championships
International taekwondo competitions hosted by Turkey
2002 in taekwondo
2002 in European sport
2002 in Turkish sport
Sports competitions in Samsun